Jules Simon Troubat (1836–1914) was a French littérateur, born at Montpellier.  He was the last secretary of Sainte-Beuve, one of his testamentary executors, and his legatee.  He published a number of posthumous works of Sainte-Beuve, such as his , an unfinished monograph on Proudhon, and three volumes of articles originally contributed to the Premiers lundis.  Troubat himself wrote:  
 Souvenirs et indiscrétions (1875)  
 Notes et pensées (1888)  
 Souvenirs du dernier secrétaire de Sainte-Beuve (1890)  
 Essais critiques (1902)  
 Sainte-Beuve intime et familier (1903)  
 Souvenirs sur Champfleury et le rélisme (1905)

References
 

1836 births
1914 deaths
French essayists
French male essayists